Cristian Vicente Torralbo Muñoz (born 20 April 1984) is a Chilean footballer. 

He played for Huachipato.

References
 Profile at BDFA 
 

1984 births
Living people
Chilean footballers
C.D. Huachipato footballers
Lota Schwager footballers
Unión San Felipe footballers
Everton de Viña del Mar footballers
Deportes Temuco footballers
Chilean Primera División players
Primera B de Chile players
Segunda División Profesional de Chile players
People from Castro

Association football goalkeepers